In Scotland, a Pend is a passageway through a building, often from a street through to a courtyard or 'back court', and may be for both vehicles and pedestrian access or exclusively pedestrians.

The term "common pend" can often be found in descriptions of Scottish property for sale, such as "a common pend shared with the residential dwellings above".

A pend is distinct from a vennel or a close, as it has rooms directly above it, whereas vennels and closes tend not to be covered over and are typically passageways between separate buildings. However, a 'close' also means a common entry to multi-dwelling tenement properties in Scotland.

Etymology 

The OED suggests that the etymology of the word is probably related to the archaic verb pend - "arch, arch over, vault", this in turn being derived from the French pendre, Latin pendēre "to hang", from which also derives the word pendulum.

References 

Architecture in Scotland
Architectural elements